Donald Trump assumed office as President of the United States on January 20, 2017, and his term ended on January 20, 2021. The president has the authority to nominate members of his Cabinet to the United States Senate for confirmation under the Appointments Clause of the United States Constitution.

Before confirmation and during congressional hearings a high-level career member of an executive department heads this pre-confirmed cabinet on an acting basis. The Cabinet's creation was part of the transition of power following the 2016 United States presidential election.

This article documents the confirmation process for any successful or unsuccessful Cabinet nominees of the Trump administration. They are listed in order of creation of the Cabinet position (also used as the basis for the United States presidential line of succession).

Cabinet

Cabinet officials on January 20, 2021
All members of the Cabinet of the United States require the advice and consent of the United States Senate following appointment by the president before taking office. The vice presidency is exceptional in that the position requires election to office pursuant to the United States Constitution. Although some are afforded cabinet-level rank, non-cabinet members within the Executive Office of the President, such as White House Chief of Staff, National Security Advisor, and White House Press Secretary, do not hold constitutionally created positions and most do not require Senate confirmation for appointment.

The following were the final members of Donald Trump's Cabinet on January 20, 2021. For other high-level positions, see the list of Donald Trump political appointments.

Confirmation process

Analysis 
Due to Trump's lack of government or military experience and his political positions, much interest was expressed in the media over his cabinet nominations, as they were believed to show how he intended to govern.

Trump's proposed cabinet was characterized by the media as being very conservative. It was described as a "conservative dream team" by Politico, "the most conservative cabinet [in United States history]" by Newsweek, and "one of the most consistently conservative domestic policy teams in modern history" by the Los Angeles Times. The Hill described Trump's potential cabinet as "an unorthodox team" popular with conservatives, that more establishment Republicans such as John McCain or Mitt Romney likely would not have chosen. CNN agreed, calling the proposed cabinet "a conservative dream team of domestic Cabinet appointments." On the other hand, The Wall Street Journal stated that "it's nearly impossible to identify a clear ideological bent in the incoming president's" cabinet nominations. The Wall Street Journal also stated that Trump's nominations signaled a pro-deregulation administration policy. Several of his cabinet nominees politically opposed the federal departments they were selected to lead.

In terms of total personal wealth, Trump's cabinet is the wealthiest in modern American history. The cabinet was largely made up of nominees who had business experience but minimal or no experience in the government when compared to the administrations of Ronald Reagan, George H. W. Bush, Bill Clinton, George W. Bush and Barack Obama. The Pew Research Center also noted that Trump's cabinet was one of the most business-heavy in American history: "A third of the department heads in the Trump administration (33%) were people whose prior experience had been entirely in the public sector. Only three other U.S. Presidents are in the same range: William McKinley (three out of eight Cabinet positions, or 37.5%), Ronald Reagan (four out of 13 positions, or 31%), and Dwight Eisenhower (three out of 10 positions, or 30%)." There were no economists in President Trump's cabinet. There were also significantly fewer lawyers in Trump's cabinet compared to previous presidents' cabinets.

Confirmation delays
Despite being nominated promptly during the transition period, most cabinet members were unable to take office on Inauguration Day because of delays in the formal confirmation process. By February 8, 2017, President Trump had fewer cabinet nominees confirmed than any prior president two weeks into his mandate, except George Washington. Part of the lateness was ascribed to opposition by Senate Democrats and part to delays in submitting background-check paperwork. The final initial Cabinet member to take office, Robert Lighthizer, took office as U.S. Trade Representative on May 11, 2017, more than four months after his nomination.

History 

Choosing members of the presidential Cabinet (and other high-level positions) is a complicated process, and began before the November 2016 general election results were known. In the case of the Trump 2016 campaign, his former rival for the Republican nomination Chris Christie was appointed to lead the transition team in May 2016, shortly after Ted Cruz and John Kasich suspended their campaigns (thus making Trump the presumptive nominee of the party). In addition to various other responsibilities, the transition team is responsible for making preliminary lists of potential executive branch appointees—at least for the several dozen high-level positions if not for the several thousand lower-level positions—and doing some early vetting work on those people. The transition team also hires policy experts (more than a hundred in the case of the Trump transition team by October 2016), using primarily federal funds and federal office space, to help plan how a then-hypothetical Trump administration would implement their policy-goals via the various federal agencies and departments.

After the election in November 2016, when the ticket formed by Trump and Pence defeated the Clinton and Kaine ticket as well as various third party opponents, the transition team was quickly reshuffled and expanded; Mike Pence was given the lead role (over Chris Christie), and several additional top-level transition personnel were added to the transition effort, most of them from the now-finished campaign effort. During the remainder of 2016, the team continued finding and vetting potential nominees for the various positions, as the Electoral College process was ongoing (including recounts in some states where the winning margin was relatively tiny) and before the presidential inauguration in January 2017.

President-elect Trump announced his first post-election Cabinet nominee, Jeff Sessions for the role of United States Attorney General, on November 18, 2016. (Trump had earlier announced Mike Pence as his pick for vice-presidential running mate in July 2016, which was shortly thereafter confirmed by the delegates to the Republican National Convention when they officially nominated first Trump and then Pence.) Although most positions were simultaneously under consideration by the transition team, the official announcement of offers, and the public acceptance of the offers, usually happens gradually as slots are filled (Richard Nixon being the exception).

For purposes of historical comparison, this chart includes only Cabinet roles, and not the cabinet-level positions. However, note that the number of Cabinet positions has varied from administration to administration: under Nixon there were twelve such roles in 1968, whereas under Trump in 2016 there are fifteen.

Formation 

After Election Day, media outlets reported on persons described by various sources as possible appointments to senior positions in the incoming Trump presidency. The number of people which have received media attention as potential cabinet appointees is higher than in most previous presidential elections, partly because the Trump '16 campaign staff (and associated PACs) was significantly smaller and less expensive, thus there are not as many people already expected to receive specific roles in the upcoming Trump administration. In particular, "Trump ha[d] a smaller policy brain trust [policy group] than a new president normally carries" because as an anti-establishment candidate who began his campaign by largely self-funding his way to the Republican Party nomination, unlike most previous presidential winners "Trump does not have the traditional cadre of Washington insiders and donors to build out his Cabinet." An additional factor that tends to make the field of potential nominees especially broad, is that unlike most presidential transition teams who select politicians as their appointees, the Trump transition team "has started with a mandate to hire from the private sector [as opposed to the governmental sector] whenever possible."

Vice president 

The vice president is the only cabinet member to be elected to the position and who does not serve at the pleasure of the president. There were dozens of potential running mates for Trump who received media speculation. Trump's eventual pick of Governor Mike Pence of Indiana was officially announced on July 16, 2016, and confirmed by acclamation via parliamentary procedure amongst delegates to the 2016 Republican National Convention on July 19, 2016.

Cabinet 
The following cabinet positions are listed in order of their creation (also used as the basis for the United States presidential line of succession).

Secretary of State 
The nomination of a Secretary-designate is reviewed during hearings held by the members of the Foreign Relations committee, then presented to the full Senate for a vote.

Thomas Shannon (acting) 
Before Tillerson was sworn in, Tom Shannon served as the acting secretary from January 20 until February 1, 2017.

Rex Tillerson 

On December 12, 2016, Rex Tillerson, CEO of ExxonMobil, was officially selected to be the Secretary of State. Tillerson was first recommended to Trump for the secretary of state role by Condoleezza Rice, during her meeting with Trump in late November. Rice's recommendation of Tillerson to Trump was backed up by Robert Gates three days later.

Tillerson's confirmation hearing with the Foreign Relations committee was held on January 11, 2017. During the hearing, Tillerson voiced support for the Trans-Pacific Partnership and opposed a Muslim immigration ban that has been proposed by Donald Trump in the past. Tillerson was approved by the Foreign Relations committee on January 23, 2017, by a vote of 11–10. On Wednesday, February 1, Tillerson was confirmed by the senate 56–43.

John Sullivan (acting) 
John J. Sullivan served as acting secretary from April 1, 2018, until April 26, 2018.

Mike Pompeo 
On March 13, 2018, Trump dismissed Rex Tillerson as Secretary of State, and announced his nomination of CIA Director Mike Pompeo to the office. Pompeo was confirmed by the Senate on April 26 in a 57–42 vote and was sworn in later that day. He served until the end of Trump's term, on January 20, 2021.

Secretary of the Treasury 
The nomination of a Secretary-designate is reviewed during hearings held by the members of the Finance committee, then presented to the full Senate for a vote.

Adam Szubin (acting) 
Adam Szubin served as acting secretary from January 20 until February 13, 2017.

Steven Mnuchin 
Trump announced the selection of investment banker Steve Mnuchin as Secretary of the Treasury on November 30, 2016. The New York Times noted that Mnuchin's selection was surprising, since Trump had attacked the banking industry and Goldman Sachs during the campaign. Mnuchin is the third Goldman alumnus to serve as treasury secretary.

During his confirmation hearing before the Senate Finance Committee on January 19, 2017, Mnuchin was criticized by Democrats due to the foreclosure practices at his company OneWest. Mnuchin also failed to disclose, in required disclosure documents, $95million of real estate he owned, and his role as director of Dune Capital International, an investment fund in a tax haven. Mnuchin described the omissions as mistakes made amid a mountain of bureaucracy.

Democrats of the Finance Committee boycotted the vote of Mnuchin and many other nominees in response to Trump's controversial immigration executive order. On February 1, 2017, Republicans suspended committee rules to send the nomination to the Senate floor on an vote of 11–0.

Mnuchin was confirmed by the full Senate 53–47 on February 13, 2017. The vote fell along party lines with exception of Senator Joe Manchin as the sole Democratic vote for Mnuchin. He served until the end of Trump's term, on January 20, 2021.

Secretary of Defense 
The nomination of a Secretary-designate is reviewed during hearings held by the members of the Armed Services committee, then presented to the full Senate for a vote.

Jim Mattis 
Trump informally announced the selection of General Jim Mattis as Secretary of Defense on December 1, 2016. (The Trump Transition Team formally announced the selection on December 6, 2016.) As with most cabinet roles, the Secretary-designate of Defense undergoes hearings before the appropriate committee of the United States Senate, followed by a confirmation-vote. In the case of Mattis, there was an additional step needed as he had retired from the military three years ago, since statute section 903(a) of the NDAA demands a minimum of seven years as a civilian for Pentagon appointees, therefore Mattis needed a waiver to be allowed to become Secretary of Defense.

During his hearing, Mattis agreed with the assessment that debt was the greatest threat to national security. He placed Russia first among the "principal threats" facing the United States and called Iran "the primary source of turmoil" for unrest in the Middle East. In contrast with Trump's campaign promises, Mattis advocated for maintaining NATO and keeping the Iran Nuclear Deal. He urged for a clear cybersecurity doctrine to be implemented.

On January 12, 2017, the Senate Armed Services Committee voted, 24–3, to grant the waiver. The full Senate voted, 81–17, to pass the waiver three hours later. After the Trump transition team canceled a meeting between Mattis and the House Armed Services Committee, the waiver narrowly passed the committee by a vote of 34–28. The House voted, 268–151, to grant the waiver. The Senate Armed Services Committee approved Mattis's confirmation on January 18, 2017, by a 26–1 margin, and sent the nomination to the full Senate for consideration. One of Donald Trump's first acts as president was the approval of Mattis's waiver to become Secretary of Defense. After being confirmed by the Senate on the evening of January 20, 2017, by a vote of 98–1, Mattis was sworn in by Vice President Pence on the same evening.

On December 20, 2018, Secretary Mattis announced his intention to resign at the end of February 2019. President Trump moved the departure date up to January 1, 2019.

Patrick Shanahan (acting) 

Upon the end of Secretary Mattis's tenure on January 1, Patrick M. Shanahan, the Deputy Secretary of Defense, became acting Secretary until June 23, 2019.

Failed nomination of Patrick Shanahan 
Five months later, in May, the White House announced its intent to nominate Shanahan to serve as Secretary of Defense on a permanent basis; by June, Shanahan withdrew, citing family issues.

Mark Esper 
With Shanahan's withdrawal, President Trump named Mark Esper, the Secretary of the Army, as his replacement as acting secretary. Once Esper was officially nominated on July 15, he stepped down in accordance with the Federal Vacancies Reform Act of 1998; Richard V. Spencer, the Secretary of the Navy, then became acting secretary.

Esper was confirmed by the Senate, 90–8, on July 23, 2019; he was sworn in that day.

On November 9, 2020, Esper was removed from his position, and replaced with Christopher C. Miller.

Christopher C. Miller (acting) 
Christopher C. Miller served as acting Secretary from November 9, 2020, to the end of Trump's term.

Attorney General 
The nomination of an Attorney General-designate is reviewed during hearings held by the members of the Judiciary committee, then presented to the full Senate for a vote.

Sally Yates (acting) 
Sally Yates served as acting attorney general from January 20, 2017, until her firing on January 30 of that same year.

Dana Boente (acting) 
On January 30, 2017, Trump appointed Dana Boente, the United States Attorney for the Eastern District of Virginia, to serve as acting Attorney General until Jeff Sessions' Senate confirmation. Boente had replaced Sally Yates who was fired by Trump for ordering the Justice Department to not defend Trump's Executive Order 13769 which restricted entry to the United States. Yates claimed that, "At present, I am not convinced that the defense of the executive order is consistent with these responsibilities [of the Department of Justice], nor am I convinced that the executive order is lawful". Boente served until the confirmation of Jeff Sessions on February 9, 2017.

Jeff Sessions 
Trump's selection of Senator Jeff Sessions from Alabama was officially announced on November 18, 2016.

Members of the Democratic party in the Senate had stated their intention to oppose Sessions; that said, successfully defeating the nomination of Sessions would have required peeling away the votes of at least two or three Republican members of the Senate body. Republican members of the Judiciary Committee spoke favorably towards Sessions, as Sessions had been a former member of the Judiciary Committee while serving as senator. Although Democratic party senators, including Elizabeth Warren, criticized Sessions, at least one Democratic Senator, Joe Manchin of West Virginia, stated he would vote to confirm Sessions. Historically, there has never been a sitting senator appointed to cabinet position who was denied that post during the confirmation process.

The confirmation process for Trump's nominee Senator Jeff Sessions was described as "strikingly contentious" by The New York Times; as Senator Mitch McConnell invoked RuleXIX to silence Senator Elizabeth Warren for the rest of the consideration of the nomination. While explaining his use of the rule, McConnell said, "She [Warren] was warned. She was given an explanation. Nevertheless, she persisted." The last three words, ‘Nevertheless, she persisted’ were appropriated by feminist and liberals as a rally cry in favor of women's rights. McConnell interrupted Warren as she had read a letter by Coretta Scott King opposing Sessions' nomination to a federal judgeship along with several statements which were made by Senator Ted Kennedy in 1986 during Senate hearings on Sessions' nomination. Afterwards, Warren live-streamed herself reading the letter, critical of Sessions, that Coretta Scott King had written to Senator Strom Thurmond in 1986.

On February 8, Sessions was confirmed as United States Attorney General by a vote of 52–47, with all the Republican senators and Democratic Senator Joe Manchin voting in favor of Sessions' confirmation and all other senators voting against Sessions' confirmation. Sessions' confirmation ended a nomination battle which was described by The New York Times as "bitter and racially charged".

On November 7, 2018the day after the 2018 midterm electionsJeff Sessions resigned as Attorney General at the president's request.

Matthew Whitaker (acting) 
With the resignation of Sessions on November 7, 2018, Trump appointed Sessions' chief of staff Matthew Whitaker to serve as acting attorney general. Multiple legal challenges to Whitaker's appointment were filed. All were dismissed.

William Barr 
William Barr, a former U.S. Attorney General in the George H. W. Bush administration, was nominated to reprise his former role as the permanent replacement for Sessions. He was confirmed by the Senate in February 2019 by a 54–45 vote. Barr announced that he would resign as attorney general on December 14, 2020, which came into effect on December 23, 2020.

Jeffrey Rosen (acting) 

Jeffrey A. Rosen became the acting Attorney General following the resignation of Barr on December 23, 2020. His term ended on January 20, 2021.

Secretary of the Interior 
The nomination of a Secretary-designate is reviewed during hearings held by the members of the Energy and Natural Resources committee, then presented to the full Senate for a vote.

Kevin Haugrud (acting) 

Kevin Haugrud served as the acting Secretary of the Interior from January 20 until March 1, 2017.

Ryan Zinke 
Congressman Ryan Zinke was announced as the nominee for Secretary of the Interior on December 15, 2016. His nomination was approved by a 16–6 vote from the Senate Energy and Natural Resources Committee on January 31, 2017. Zinke was confirmed on March 1, 2017, by a vote of 68–31, becoming the first Navy SEAL to occupy a Cabinet position.
Zinke resigned as Secretary of the Interior on January 2, 2019. Deputy Secretary David Bernhardt became Acting Secretary of the Interior.

David Bernhardt (acting) 
David Bernhardt served as acting secretary from January2 until April 11, 2019, when he was sworn in.

David Bernhardt 
On February 4, 2019, President Donald Trump announced his intention to nominate Interior Deputy Secretary and current Acting Secretary Bernhardt to be the next United States Secretary of the Interior. Bernhardt was confirmed on April 11, 2019, with a 56–41 vote. He served until the end of Trump's term.

Secretary of Agriculture 
The nomination of a Secretary-designate is reviewed during hearings held by the members of the Agriculture, Nutrition, and Forestry committee, then presented to the full Senate for a vote.

Mike Young (acting) 
Mike Young served as acting secretary from January 20 until April 25, 2017.

Sonny Perdue 
On January 18, 2017, Sonny Perdue, former governor of Georgia, was selected to be the Secretary of Agriculture. On April 24, 2017, Perdue was confirmed by the Senate in an 87–11 vote. He served until the end of the Trump administration, on January 20, 2021.

Secretary of Commerce 
The nomination of a Secretary-designate is reviewed during hearings held by the members of the Commerce, Science, and Transportation committee, then presented to the full Senate for a vote.

Vacant 
President Trump left this position vacant until Ross was sworn in.

Wilbur Ross 
Trump's selection of CEO Wilbur Ross from Florida (formerly of New York) was officially announced on November 30, 2016. Confirmation hearings were originally scheduled for January 12, but were postponed because the Commerce Committee had not yet received the ethics agreement from the Office of Government Ethics and the Department of Commerce. On February 27, 2017, he was confirmed by the United States Senate in a 72–27 vote. He assumed office on February 28, 2017, and left office at the end of the Trump administration.

Secretary of Labor 
The nomination of a Secretary-designate is reviewed during hearings held by the members of the Health, Education, Labor, and Pensions committee, then presented to the full Senate for a vote.

Edward Hugler (acting) 
Edward C. Hugler served as acting secretary from January20 until April 28, 2017.

Failed nomination of Andy Puzder 

On December 8, 2016, Andy Puzder, then CEO of CKE Restaurants, was officially selected to be the Secretary of Labor. The Health, Education, Labor, and Pensions committee (HELP) delayed Puzder's hearing five times due to missing paperwork from the Office of Government Ethics. It was revealed that before the nomination Puzder employed a housekeeper who was not authorized to work in the U.S. Puzder failed to pay employer taxes. Puzder fired the housekeeper and amended his taxes only after his nomination. Prior cabinet nominations from the Bush and Clinton administrations with undocumented housekeepers have had to withdraw their nominations.

On February 8, 2017, the Office of Government Ethics submitted Puzder's ethics paperwork to Congress. It was also revealed Puzder's ex-wife Lisa Fierstein appeared in disguise on Oprah Winfrey's talk show in the 1980s. In the interview, she alleged Puzder beat her. She later recanted. Fierstein sent a letter to Congress shortly after his nomination stating, "Andy is not and was not abusive or violent." Complying with the HELP committee, the Oprah Winfrey Network produced tapes from the interview for members of the committee to view. Four Republican Senators from the HELP committeeSusan Collins, Tim Scott, Johnny Isakson, and Lisa Murkowskiexpressed doubt over Puzder's nomination. On February 15, a day before his scheduled hearing, Puzder released a statement to the Associated Press officially withdrawing his nomination.

Alex Acosta 

On February 16, 2017, Alex Acosta, dean of the Florida International University College of Law and former Justice Department attorney, was officially selected to be the Secretary of Labor. On April 27, 2017, Acosta was confirmed by the Senate in a 60–38 vote.

Acosta announced his resignation on July 12, 2019, following widespread criticism of his handling of the prosecution of and subsequent plea deal with Jeffrey Epstein when serving as U.S. District Attorney in Florida. His deputy, Patrick Pizzella, became acting secretary.

Patrick Pizzella (acting) 
Patrick Pizzella served as acting secretary from July 20 until September 30, 2019.

Eugene Scalia 
On July 18, 2019, President Trump announced his intent to nominate Eugene Scalia, the former Solicitor of Labor and the son of Antonin Scalia, to be Secretary of Labor; the nomination became official on August 27.

Almost exactly a month later, on September 26, Scalia was confirmed by the Senate in a 53–44 vote. He was sworn in four days later. He served until January 20, 2021, the start of the next administration.

Secretary of Health and Human Services 
Although historically the nominee also holds meetings with the Health, Education, Labor, and Pensions committee, officially the nomination of a Secretary-designate is reviewed during hearings held by the members of the United States Senate Committee on Finance, then presented to the full Senate for a vote.

Norris Cochran (acting) 
Norris Cochran served as acting secretary from January 20 until February 10, 2017.

Tom Price 
Trump's selection of Representative Tom Price from Georgia was officially announced on November 28, 2016. Price was confirmed by the Senate on February 10, 2017, in a 52–47 vote along party lines, with all Republicans voting in favor and all Democrats voting against.

Price resigned on September 29, 2017, amid reports that he had expended more than $1million of department funds for his own travel on private charter jets and military aircraft. Price is the shortest-serving confirmed Secretary of Health and Human Services, with a tenure of just 231 days.

Don J. Wright (acting) 
Don J. Wright served as acting secretary from September 29, 2017, until his resignation on October 10, 2017.

Eric Hargan (acting) 
Eric Hargan served as acting secretary from October 10, 2017, until January 29, 2018.

Alex Azar 
On November 13, 2017, President Trump announced via Twitter that Alex Azar was his nominee to be the next HHS Secretary. Azar was the former deputy secretary of the U.S. Department of Health and Human Services under George W. Bush (2005–2007) and president of Lilly USA, LLC, the largest affiliate of global biopharmaceutical leader Eli Lilly and Company from 2012 to 2017. Azar was confirmed by 53–43 vote on January 24, 2018. He took office on January 29, 2018, and left office on January 20, 2021.

Secretary of Housing and Urban Development 
The nomination of a secretary-designate is reviewed during hearings held by the members of the Banking, Housing, and Urban Affairs committee, then presented to the full Senate for a vote.

Craig Clemmensen (acting) 
Craig Clemmensen served as acting secretary from January 20 until March 2, 2017.

Ben Carson 
On December 5, 2016, President-elect Donald Trump announced that he would nominate Ben Carson to the position of Secretary of Housing and Urban Development. During confirmation hearings, Carson was held under close scrutiny for his lack of relevant experience, and because he has been one of the most hostile critics of HUD's role in enforcing anti-discrimination laws.
On January 24, 2017, the Senate Banking Committee voted unanimously to approve the nomination, sending it to the Senate floor for a complete vote. On March 2, 2017, Carson was confirmed by the United States Senate in a 58–41 vote. He served until the end of the Trump administration, on January 20, 2021.

Secretary of Transportation 
The nomination of a Secretary-designate is reviewed during hearings held by the members of the Commerce, Science, and Transportation committee, then presented to the full Senate for a vote.

Michael Huerta (acting) 
Michael Huerta served as acting secretary from January 20 until January 31, 2017.

Elaine Chao 
On November 29, 2016, it was reported that President-elect Trump had selected former United States Secretary of Labor Elaine Chao of Kentucky as his Secretary of Transportation. On January 31, Chao was confirmed by the Senate by a vote of 93–6. On January 7, 2021, Chao announced her resignation effective January 11, due to the January 6 U.S. Capitol attack.

Steven G. Bradbury (acting) 
With the resignation of Chao, her deputy, Steven G. Bradbury became acting Secretary on January 11, 2021, and served for the final days of the administration.

Secretary of Energy 
The nomination of a Secretary-designate is reviewed during hearings held by the members of the Energy and Natural Resources committee, then presented to the full Senate for a vote.

Grace Bochenek (acting) 
Grace Bochenek served as acting secretary from January 20 until March 2, 2017.

Rick Perry 
On December 13, 2016, Rick Perry, former Governor of Texas, was selected to be the Secretary of Energy. During a previous presidential campaign, Perry said he intended to abolish the department. His nomination was approved by a 16–7 vote from the United States Senate Committee on Energy and Natural Resources on January 31, 2017. On March 2, 2017, Perry was confirmed by the United States Senate in a 62–37 vote.

On October 17, 2019, Rick Perry informed President Trump that he planned to resign by the end of the year. On October 18, 2019, Trump nominated the Deputy Secretary of Energy, Dan Brouillette, to replace him; Perry left in early December.

Dan Brouillette 
Dan Brouillette, the Deputy Secretary, served as acting secretary from December2 until December 4, 2019. He was confirmed by the Senate by a 70–15 vote, on December 2, 2019. He left his position on January 20, 2021.

Secretary of Education 
The nomination of a Secretary-designate is reviewed during hearings held by the members of the Health, Education, Labor and Pensions Committee, then presented to the full Senate for a vote.

Phil Rosenfelt (acting) 
Phil Rosenfelt served as acting secretary from January 20 until February 7, 2017.

Betsy DeVos 

Trump's selection of former RNC member Betsy DeVos from Michigan was officially announced on November 23, 2016.

Originally scheduled for January 11, but was postponed because the Office of Government Ethics had not completed its review of DeVos' financial holdings and potential conflicts of interest. On January 20, the Office of Government Ethics completed their ethics report on DeVos, three days after her hearing with the Committee on Health, Education, Labor and Pensions was held. Senate Democrats requested a second hearing for DeVos after the ethics report was released, but committee chair Senator Lamar Alexander denied it. DeVos repeatedly said she would divest from 102 companies within ninety days if confirmed. On February 7, 2017, the full senate voted 51–50with Vice President Pence casting the tie-breaking voteto confirm DeVos, with Pence becoming the first vice president to cast the tie-breaking vote for a cabinet nominee  ever. DeVos resigned on January 7, 2021, due to the 2021 storming of the United States Capitol, effective the next day.

Mick Zais (acting) 
Deputy Secretary Mick Zais succeeded DeVos in an acting capacity on January 8, 2021, and served for the final days of the administration.

Secretary of Veterans Affairs 
The nomination of a Secretary-designate is reviewed during hearings held by the members of the Veterans Affairs committee, then presented to the full Senate for a vote.

Robert Snyder (acting) 
Robert Snyder served as acting secretary from January 20 until February 14, 2017.

David Shulkin 
On January 11, 2017, David Shulkin, the Under Secretary of Veterans Affairs for Health under President Barack Obama, was selected to be the Secretary of Veterans Affairs. He was later confirmed by the Senate by a 100 to 0 vote.

In February 2018, the VA inspector general issued a report criticizing Shulkin for misusing department funds to pay for his and his wife's personal travel. On March 28, Trump fired him.

Robert Wilkie (acting) 
Robert Wilkie served as acting secretary from March 28 until May 29, 2018.

Peter O'Rourke (acting) 
Peter O'Rourke served as acting secretary from May 29 until July 30, 2018.

Failed nomination of Ronny Jackson 
Trump initially said he would replace Shulkin with Ronny Jackson, his White House personal physician. Senators expressed skepticism of the nomination due to Jackson's lack of management experience. Current and former employees on the White House Medical Unit accused Jackson of creating a hostile work environment, excessively drinking on the job, and improperly dispensing medication. Trump defended Jackson as "one of the finest people that I have met", but hinted that Jackson might withdraw from being considered for the position. Jackson withdrew his nomination on April 26.

Robert Wilkie 
The President nominated Former Defense Undersecretary and VA Acting Secretary Robert Wilkie on May 18, 2018, to replace Shulkin. Wilkie was confirmed by the Senate on July 23, 2018, with an 86–9 vote. He served until the end of Trump's term.

Secretary of Homeland Security 

The nomination of a Secretary-designate is reviewed during hearings held by the members of the Homeland Security and Governmental Affairs committee, then presented to the full Senate for a vote.

John Kelly 
On December 7, 2016, John F. Kelly, retired four-star Marine general, was selected to be the Secretary of Homeland Security. He was confirmed by the Senate with a vote of
88–11 and sworn in on the evening of January 20. Kelly's term ended on July 28, 2017, following his appointment as White House Chief of Staff.

Elaine Duke (acting) 
Elaine Duke served as acting secretary from July 31 until December 6, 2017.

Kirstjen Nielsen 
On October 11, 2017, multiple sources reported Trump's interest in nominating Kirstjen Nielsen as Secretary of Homeland Security. She had served as Principal Deputy White House Chief of Staff to Chief of Staff John F. Kelly. On December 5, 2017, the Senate confirmed her nomination, by a 62–37 vote. She took office the next day. On April 7, 2019, Nielsen resigned, with effect on April 11.

Kevin McAleenan (acting) 
Kevin McAleenan served as acting secretary from April 11 until November 13, 2019, when he resigned.

Chad Wolf (acting) 
Chad Wolf served as acting secretary from November 13, 2019, until he resigned on January 11, 2021.

Pete Gaynor (acting) 
Pete Gaynor, Administrator of the Federal Emergency Management Agency, succeeded Wolf in an acting capacity on January 12, 2021. he left office on January 20, 2021.

Cabinet-level officials 

Cabinet-level officials have positions that are considered to be of Cabinet level, but which are not part of the Cabinet. Which exact positions are considered part of the presidential cabinet, can vary with the president. The CIA and FEMA were cabinet-level agencies under Bill Clinton, but not George W. Bush. The head of the Office of National Drug Control Policy (aka the drug czar) was a cabinet-level position under both Bill Clinton and George W. Bush, but not under Barack Obama. (Not to be confused with the head of the DEA, who has remained in the org chart underneath the cabinet position held by the Attorney General.) Designation of an agency as being cabinet-level requires that Congress enact legislation, although executive orders unilaterally created by the president can be used to create many other types of position inside the executive branch. Members of the cabinet proper, as well as cabinet-level officials, meet with the president in a room adjacent to the Oval Office.

White House Chief of Staff 
The White House Chief of Staff has traditionally been the highest-ranking employee of the White House. The responsibilities of the chief of staff are both managerial and advisory over the president's official business. The chief of staff is appointed by and serves at the pleasure of the president; it does not require Senate confirmation.

Reince Priebus 
Trump's selection of former RNC chair Reince Priebus from Wisconsin was officially announced on November 13, 2016. This role does not require Senate confirmation. The appointment of Steve Bannon as Chief Strategist was announced simultaneously. Although that strategy-role is not a Cabinet-level position in the statutory sense, in an "unusual arrangement" Priebus and Bannon were envisioned by the Trump transition team as being equal partners, and were announced simultaneously. With Priebus accepting a role within the administration, Ronna Romney McDaniel was elected to replace Priebus in his former role as RNC chair. Priebus resigned on July 28, 2017.

John Kelly 
On July 28, 2017, Trump announced his Secretary for Homeland Security, John Kelly, would serve as his chief of staff. On December 8, 2018, Trump announced that Kelly would be leaving as chief of staff.

Mick Mulvaney (acting) 
OMB Director Mick Mulvaney concurrently served as acting White House Chief of Staff from January 2, 2019, until March 31, 2020.

Mark Meadows 
Mark Meadows replaced Mick Mulvaney on March 31, 2020.

United States Trade Representative 
The nomination of a Director-designate is reviewed during hearings held by the members of the United States Senate Committee on Finance then presented to the full Senate for a vote.

Maria Pagan (acting) 
Maria Pagan served in this position from January 20 until March 2, 2017.

Stephen Vaughn (acting) 
Stephen Vaughn served in this position from March2 until May 15, 2017.

Robert Lighthizer 
On January 3, 2017, Robert Lighthizer, a former Deputy United States Trade Representative under President Ronald Reagan, was selected to be the United States Trade Representative. Due to Lighthizer's prior representation of foreign governments with a trade dispute with the United States, he will first need to obtain a special waiver to bypass the Lobbying Disclosure Act. The waiver would need to pass Congress and have the President's signature to assume the position. Congress waived the ban for Charlene Barshefsky, President Clinton's choice for Trade Representative in 1997. Lighthizer was confirmed as U.S. Trade Representative on May 11, 2017, by a margin of 82–14.

Director of National Intelligence

Mike Dempsey (acting) 
Mike Dempsey served in this position from January 20 until March 15, 2017.

Dan Coats 
On January 7, 2017, Dan Coats, former senator of Indiana, was officially selected to be the Director of National Intelligence. On March 15, 2017, Coats was confirmed by the Senate by a vote of 85–12. On August 15, 2019, Coats resigned from his position as Director of National Intelligence.

Joseph Maguire (acting) 
Joseph Maguire took over as acting director on August 16, 2019. He resigned on February 21, 2020.

Richard Grenell (acting) 
Richard Grenell took office as acting director on February 21, 2020, and resigned to take a position in the 2020 Trump Campaign.

John Lee Ratcliffe 
Former Congressman John Ratcliffe was confirmed and assumed the position May 26, 2020.

Ambassador to the United Nations 
Like all ambassadorships and all official Cabinet positions, the nominee for this ambassador to the U.N. requires confirmation by the Senate. The nomination of an Ambassador-designate to the United Nations is reviewed during hearings held by the members of the Senate Foreign Relations Committee, and then presented to the full Senate for a vote.

Michele Sison (acting) 
Michele J. Sison served in this position from January 20 until January 27, 2017.

Nikki Haley 

Trump officially announced Governor Nikki Haley from South Carolina as his selection for this role on November 23, 2016. She was confirmed on January 24, 2017, and subsequently resigned as South Carolina governor. Haley supported Marco Rubio in the Republican primaries and caucuses, but later endorsed Trump as the presumptive Republican nominee. Haley's lieutenant governor, Henry McMaster, who was an early supporter of Trump, was also under consideration for a role in the Trump administration, but since he did not accept such a role, he succeeded to the governorship of South Carolina upon Haley's resignation. On October 9, 2018, Haley announced that she was resigning her position as Ambassador effective at the end of 2018.

Jonathan Cohen (acting) 
Jonathan Cohen served in this position from June8 until November 17, 2019.

Failed nomination of Heather Nauert 
On December 7, 2018, Trump nominated Heather Nauert for UN Ambassador. Nauert withdrew her nomination on February 22, 2019.

Kelly Knight Craft 
On February 22, 2019, Ambassador Kelly Craft was nominated by President Donald Trump to replace Nikki Haley, who had resigned two months prior, as his envoy to the United Nations. Heather Nauert, reportedly the first choice, had withdrawn herself from consideration. Craft was confirmed on July 31, 2019.

Director of the Office of Management and Budget 
The nomination of a Director-designate is reviewed during hearings held by the members of the Homeland Security and Governmental Affairs Committee and Budget Committee then presented to the full Senate for a vote.

Mark Sandy (acting) 
Mark Sandy served in this position from January 20 until February 16, 2017.

Mick Mulvaney 
On December 13, 2016, Mick Mulvaney, U.S. Representative for South Carolina's 5th congressional district, was selected to be the Director of the Office of Management and Budget.

In his statement to the Senate Budget Committee, Mulvaney admitted that he had failed to pay $15,000 in payroll taxes from 2000 to 2004 for a nanny he had hired to care for his triplets. Mulvaney said he did not pay the taxes because he viewed the woman as a babysitter rather than as a household employee. After filling out a questionnaire from the Trump transition team, he realized the lapse and began the process of paying back taxes and fees. Senate Democrats noted that Republicans had previously insisted that past Democratic nominees' failure to pay taxes for their household employees was disqualifying, including former Health and Human Services nominee Tom Daschle in 2009.

Budget Chairman Senator Mike Enzi (R-Wyoming) noted on the Senate floor, "According to Senate records from President Jimmy Carter to President Obama, the longest it has ever taken to approve a first budget director for a new president was one weekone week." On February 16, 2017, the Senate confirmed Mulvaney, 51–49.

Russell Vought (acting) 
Russell Vought has served in this position since January 2, 2019.

Director of the Central Intelligence Agency 
On February 8, 2017, President Trump outlined the 24 members of the Cabinet with the Director of the Central Intelligence Agency being newly included. The nomination of a Director-designate is reviewed during hearings held by the members of the United States Senate Select Committee on Intelligence and then presented to the full Senate for a vote.

Meroe Park (acting) 
Meroe Park served in this position from January 20 until January 23, 2017.

Mike Pompeo 
On November 18, 2016, Mike Pompeo, the Representative of Kansas's 4th congressional district, was officially selected to be the Director of the Central Intelligence Agency. He was confirmed by the United States Senate on January 23, 2017, with a vote of 66–32. Pompeo was opposed by 30 Democratic Senators while the sole Republican vote against him came from Rand Paul. He was sworn in on the same night by Vice President Mike Pence.

On March 13, 2018, Pompeo was named as secretary designate of the State Department following the dismissal of Rex Tillerson.

Gina Haspel (acting) 
Gina Haspel served in this position from April 26, 2018, until May 21 when she was sworn in.

Gina Haspel 
On March 13, 2018, President Trump announced via Twitter that he would nominate Gina Haspel to be the CIA director. On May 17, Haspel was confirmed by the Senate in a 54–45 vote, officially giving her the post, and making her the first full-time female CIA director.

Administrator of the Environmental Protection Agency 
The nomination of an Administrator-designate is reviewed during hearings held by the members of the Environment and Public Works Committee, then presented to the full Senate for a vote.

Catherine McCabe (acting)
Catherine McCabe served in this position from January 20 until February 17, 2017.

Scott Pruitt 
On December 7, 2016, Scott Pruitt, Attorney General of Oklahoma was selected to be the Administrator of the Environmental Protection Agency. In response to the nomination, Pruitt said, "I intend to run this agency in a way that fosters both responsible protection of the environment and freedom for American businesses."

During his January 18 confirmation hearing, Pruitt's testimony openly acknowledged climate change. Pruitt declared the EPA has a "very important role" in regulating carbon dioxide emissions. Pruitt has sued the Environmental Protection Agency as the Attorney General of Oklahoma on more than a dozen occasions. When pressed by Senator Ed Markey on whether he would recuse himself from ongoing lawsuits, Pruitt "would not commit to recusing himself from all the cases he had brought." Pruitt deflected questioning from Senator Bernie Sanders (I-Vt.) on the issue of whether human activity is largely responsible for climate change. Stating, "I believe the ability to measure, with precision, the degree of human activity's impact on the climate is subject to more debate on whether the climate is changing or whether human activity contributes to it." Pruitt declined to comment on whether California could set its own emission standards and said he would review the policy.

Amid 15 federal investigations of his conduct ranging from criminal record destruction to corrupt allocation of funds and abuse of power, Pruitt announced he would resign from office on July 6, 2018, leaving Andrew R. Wheeler as the acting head of the agency.

Andrew Wheeler (acting) 
Andrew R. Wheeler served in this position from July 9, 2018, until February 28, 2019, when he was sworn in.

Andrew Wheeler 
On November 16, 2018, President Trump nominated Acting Administrator Andrew Wheeler to the position full-time. Wheeler was confirmed by the senate on February 28, 2019, with a 52–47 vote.

Administrator of the Small Business Administration 
The nomination of an Administrator-designate is reviewed during hearings held by the members of the United States Senate Committee on Small Business and Entrepreneurship and then presented to the full Senate for a vote.

Joseph Loddo (acting) 
Joseph Loddo served in this position from January 20 until February 14, 2017.

Linda McMahon 
On December 7, 2016, Linda McMahon, former CEO of World Wrestling Entertainment Inc. and Senate nominee, was selected to be the head of the Small Business Administration. McMahon was confirmed by a Senate vote of 81–19 on February 14, 2017.

McMahon earned approval votes from Senators Richard Blumenthal and Chris Murphy from Connecticut, who had both defeated McMahon in their respective Senate races. Senator Jim Risch (R-Idaho), chairman of the Senate Committee on Small Businesses and Entrepreneurship, said, "Mrs. McMahon made it very clear that she has the experience, understanding and instincts necessary to bolster America's small business community and advocate for much-needed regulatory reforms."

Chris Pilkerton (acting) 
Chris Pilkerton served in this position from April 13, 2019, until January 14, 2020.

Jovita Carranza 
On April 4, 2019 President Trump nominated Treasurer of the United States Jovita Carranza to the Small Business Administration, replacing Linda McMahon. Carranza was confirmed by a vote of 88–5 in the Senate on January 7, 2020.

Removal of the Chair of the Council of Economic Advisers 
On February 8, 2017, President Trump outlined the 24 members of the Cabinet, excluding the Council of Economic Advisers chairman position. In addition to the chairman, the council had two other members, also appointed by the president, as well as a staff of economists, researchers, and statisticians. Historically, appointees to chair the council have held Ph.D.s in economics, and the role of the group is to provide advice in the form of economic analysis with respect to policy, as distinct from shaping economic policy per se.

Trump released a list of his campaign's official economic advisers in August 2016, which simultaneously was anti-establishment and therefore leant on those with governmental experience, yet at the same time aimed to include some members of business and finance. Many of the listed names received media attention as potential appointees to the Council of Economic Advisers, or in other Trump administration roles.

Although removed from the Cabinet, the chair-designate, must be reviewed during hearings held by the members of the United States Senate Committee on Banking, Housing, and Urban Affairs and then presented to the full Senate for a vote.

Various other Trump administration appointees are directly involved with economic matters, for example, former director of the National Economic Council Gary Cohn, former National Trade Council director Peter Navarro, SEC chairman Jay Clayton, OMB director Mick Mulvaney, Treasury secretary Steven Mnuchin, Commerce secretary Wilbur Ross, U.S. Trade Representative Robert Lighthizer and former SBA administrator Linda McMahon. On May 16, 2017, Trump nominated Dr. Kevin Hassett to be chair of the council. He took office on September 13, 2017.

See also 

Inauguration of Donald Trump
List of Trump administration dismissals and resignations
Presidential transition of Donald Trump

Explanatory notes

Citations

External links
List of Cabinet and Cabinet Level Officers at White House website

 
Trump, Donald
Cabinets established in 2017
Cabinets disestablished in 2021
Cabinet
Articles containing video clips